John Laird Abercrombie (December 16, 1944 – August 22, 2017) was an American jazz guitarist. His work explored jazz fusion, free jazz, and avant-garde jazz. Abercrombie studied at Berklee College of Music in Boston, Massachusetts. He was known for his understated style and his work with organ trios.

Career

Early life and education
John Abercrombie was born on December 16, 1944, in Port Chester, New York. Growing up in the 1950s in Greenwich, Connecticut he was attracted to the rock and roll of Chuck Berry, Elvis Presley, Fats Domino, and Bill Haley and the Comets. He also liked the sound of jazz guitarist Mickey Baker of the vocal duo Mickey and Silvia. He had two friends who were musicians with a large jazz collection. They played him albums by Dave Brubeck and Miles Davis. The first jazz guitar album he heard was by Barney Kessel.

He took guitar lessons at the age of ten, asking his teacher to show him what Barney Kessel was playing. After high school, he attended Berklee College of Music. At Berklee, he was drawn to the music of Jim Hall, the 1962 album The Bridge by Sonny Rollins, and Wes Montgomery on his albums The Wes Montgomery Trio (1959) and Boss Guitar (1963). He cites George Benson and Pat Martino as inspirations. He often played with other students at Paul's Mall, a jazz club in Boston connected to a larger club, Jazz Workshop. Appearing at Paul's Mall led to meetings with Michael Brecker, Randy Brecker, and organist Johnny Hammond Smith, who invited him to go on tour.

Stark Reality, Dreams, and Gateway
Abercrombie graduated from Berklee in 1967 and attended North Texas State University before moving to New York City in 1969. Before becoming a popular session musician, he joined Monty Stark's band, Stark Reality, in 1969 and recorded several sides including Stark Reality Discovers Hoagy Carmichael's Music Shop. Abercrombie went on to record with Gato Barbieri in 1971, Barry Miles in 1972, and Gil Evans in 1974. In 1969 he joined the Brecker Brothers in the jazz-rock fusion band Dreams. He continued to play fusion in Billy Cobham's band, but found that he disliked its focus on rock over jazz. Nonetheless his reputation grew with the popularity of both Cobham and Dreams. The band shared billing with such acts as the Doobie Brothers, but Abercrombie found his career taking an unwanted direction. "One night we appeared at the Spectrum in Philadelphia and I thought, 'What am I doing here?' It just didn't compute."

An invitation from drummer Jack DeJohnette led to the fulfillment of Abercrombie's desire to play in a jazz-oriented ensemble. Around the same time, record producer Manfred Eicher, founder and president of ECM Records, invited him to record an album. He recorded his first solo album, Timeless, with DeJohnette and keyboardist Jan Hammer, who had been his roommate in the 1960s. In 1975 he formed the band Gateway with DeJohnette and bassist Dave Holland, recording the albums Gateway (1976) and Gateway 2 (1978). Though Abercrombie would record for other labels going forward, ECM became his mainstay, and his association with that label continued for the rest of his career.

Working as a leader
The Gateway band played songs written by all three members, in a free jazz style. Following his albums as a member of the Gateway trio, Abercrombie moved to playing in a more traditional style, recording for ECM three albums, Arcade (1979), Abercrombie Quartet (1979), and M (1981) with a quartet that included pianist Richie Beirach, bassist George Mraz, and drummer Peter Donald. Abercrombie said, "it was extremely important to have that group ... it was my first opportunity to really be a leader and write consistently for the same group of musicians." During the mid-1970s and into the 1980s, he contributed to ensembles led by DeJohnette and participated in other sessions for ECM, occasionally doubling on electric mandolin. He toured with guitarist Ralph Towner with whom he recorded two albums, Sargasso Sea (1976) and Five Years Later (1981). During the mid-1980s, he continued to play standards with bassist George Mraz, and he played in a bop duo with guitarist John Scofield. He also appeared on a number of ECM releases in various ensembles with other artists on the label.

Between 1984 and 1990, Abercrombie experimented with a guitar synthesizer. He first used the instrument, though not exclusively, in 1984 in a trio with Marc Johnson on bass and Peter Erskine on drums, as well as with pianist Paul Bley in a free jazz group. The synthesizer allowed him to play what he called "louder, more open music." Abercrombie's trio with Johnson and Erskine released three albums during this time showcasing the guitar-synth: Current Events (1986), Getting There (1988, with Michael Brecker), and a live album, John Abercrombie / Marc Johnson / Peter Erskine (1989).

The 1990s and 2000s marked a time of many new associations. In 1992, Abercrombie, drummer Adam Nussbaum, and Hammond organist Jeff Palmer made a free-jazz album. He then started a trio with Nussbaum and organist Dan Wall and released While We're Young (1992), Speak of the Devil (1994), and Tactics (1997). He added trumpeter Kenny Wheeler, violinist Mark Feldman and saxophonist Joe Lovano to the trio to record Open Land (1999). The Gateway band reunited for the albums Homecoming (1995) and In the Moment (1996).

Abercrombie continued to tour and record to the end of his life. He also continued to release albums on the ECM label, an association which lasted for more than 40 years. As he said in an interview, "I'd like people to perceive me as having a direct connection to the history of jazz guitar, while expanding some musical boundaries."

In 2017, Abercrombie died of heart failure in Cortlandt Manor, New York, at the age of 72.

Discography

As leader or co-leader
 Timeless (ECM, 1975) 
 Sargasso Sea (ECM, 1976) 
 Characters (ECM, 1978)
 Arcade (ECM, 1979) 
 Abercrombie Quartet (ECM, 1980) 
 Straight Flight (Jam, 1980) 
 M (ECM, 1981) 
 Route Two (Landslide, 1981) 
 Five Years Later (ECM, 1982) 
 The Midweek Blues (Plug, 1983) 
 Night (ECM, 1984) 
 Drum Strum (1750 Arch, 1984) 
 Solar (Palo Alto, 1984) 
 Current Events (ECM, 1986) 
 All Strings Attached (Verve, 1987) 
 Emerald City (Pathfinder, 1987) 
 Getting There (ECM, 1988) 
 My Foolish Heart (Jazz City, 1988) 
 John Abercrombie / Marc Johnson / Peter Erskine (ECM, 1989)
 Upon a Time (New Albion, 1989) 
 Animato (ECM, 1989) 
 Abracadabra (Soul Note, 1990) 
 Double Variations (Justin Time, 1990) 
 Secret Obsession (Nabel, 1991) 
 Witchcraft (Justin Time, 1991) 
 Yesterday's Tomorrow (European Music Productions, 1991) 
 The Toronto Concert (Maracatu, 1992) 
 Ease On (AudioQuest Music, 1993) 
 Farewell (Musidisc, 1993) 
 November (ECM, 1993) 
 While We're Young (ECM, 1993) 
 Speak of the Devil (ECM, 1994) 
 Tactics (ECM, 1997) 
 Standard Transmission (GOWI Records, 1997) 
 Open Land (ECM, 1999) 
 The Hudson Project (Stretch, 2000) 
 Burn'in The Blues (Consolidated Artists Productions, 2001) 
 That's for Sure (Challenge, 2002) 
 Cat 'n' Mouse (ECM, 2002) 
 Noisy Old Men (Jam, 2002) 
 Three Guitars (Chesky, 2003) 
 Animations (Underhill Jazz, 2003) 
 Class Trip (ECM, 2004) 
 Alone Together (Acoustic Music, 2004) 
 Brand New (Challenge, 2004) 
 Echoes (Alessa, 2005) 
 Structures (Chesky, 2006) 
 The Third Quartet (ECM, 2007) 
 Topics (Challenge, 2007) 
 Coincidence (Whaling City Sound, 2007) 
 Tales (Sony BMG, 2008) 
 Wait Till You See Her (ECM, 2009) 
 Cradle of Light (EFCM, 2009) 
 Speak to Me (Pirouet, 2011) 
 Within a Song (ECM, 2012) 
 39 Steps (ECM, 2013) 
 The Angle Below (SteepleChase, 2013)
 Inspired (ArtistShare, 2016) 
 Up and Coming (ECM, 2017)  

With Gateway
 Gateway (ECM, 1976) 
 Gateway 2 (ECM, 1978)
 Homecoming (ECM, 1995)
 In the Moment (ECM, 1996)

With Andy LaVerne
 Natural Living (Musidisc, 1990)
 Nosmo King (SteepleChase, 1994)
 Now It Can Be Played (SteepleChase, 1995)
 Where We Were (Double-Time, 1996)
 A Nice Idea (Steeplechase, 2005)
 Live from New York (Steeplechase, 2010)

As sideman
With Franco Ambrosetti
Light Breeze (Enja, 1998)

With Gato Barbieri
 Under Fire (Flying Dutchman, 1971 [1973])
 Bolivia (Flying Dutchman, 1973)

With Billy Cobham
 Crosswinds (Atlantic, 1974)
 Total Eclipse (Atlantic, 1974)
 Shabazz (Atlantic, 1975)

With Marc Copland
 Second Look (Savoy, 1996)
 That's For Sure (2001)
 ...And (Hatology, 2003)
 Another Place (Pirouet, 2008)

With Jack DeJohnette
 Sorcery (Prestige, 1974)
 Cosmic Chicken (Prestige, 1975) 
 Untitled (ECM, 1976)
 Pictures (ECM, 1977) 
 New Rags (ECM, 1977) 
 New Directions (ECM, 1978)
 New Directions in Europe (ECM, Live 1979, rel. 1980)

With Peter Erskine
 Transition (Denon, 1987)
 Motion Poet (Denon, 1988)

With Danny Gottlieb
 Aquamarine (Atlantic Jazz, 1987)
 Whirlwind (Atlantic, 1989)
 Brooklyn Blues (Big World, 1991) 

With Dave Liebman
 Lookout Farm (ECM, 1973)
 Drum Ode (ECM, 1974)
 Sweet Hands (Horizon, 1975)

With Rudy Linka
 Rudy Linka Quartet (Arta, 1991)
 Mostly Standards (Arta, 1993)
 Lucky Southern (Quinton, 2006)
 Every Moment (Acoustic Music, 2011)

With Charles Lloyd
 Voice in the Night (ECM, 1999)
 The Water Is Wide (ECM, 2000)
 Hyperion with Higgins (ECM, 2001)
 Lift Every Voice (ECM, 2002)

With Barry Miles
 White Heat (Mainstream, 1971)
 Scatbird (Mainstream, 1972)

With Terry Plumeri
 He Who Lives In Many Places (Airborne, 1971) 
 Ongoing (Airborne, 1978)

With Enrico Rava
 Katcharpari (MPS/BASF, 1973)
 The Pilgrim and the Stars (ECM, 1975)
 Pupa o Crisalide (RCA, 1975)
 "Quotation Marks" (Japo, 1976)
 The Plot (ECM, 1977)

With Johnny "Hammond" Smith
 Nasty! (Prestige, 1968)
 Forever Taurus (Milestone, 1976)
 Storm Warning (Milestone, 1977)

With Lonnie Smith
 Afro Blue (1993)
 Purple Haze: Tribute to Jimi Hendrix (1995)
 Foxy Lady: Tribute to Jimi Hendrix (1996)

With Collin Walcott
 Cloud Dance (ECM, 1975)
 Grazing Dreams (ECM, 1977)

With Kenny Wheeler
 Deer Wan (ECM, 1977)
 Music for Large & Small Ensembles (ECM, 1990)
 The Widow in the Window (ECM, 1990)
 It Takes Two! (2006)

With others
 Horacee Arnold – Tales of the Exonerated Flea (Columbia, 1974)
 Jerry Bergonzi – Tenorist (Savant, 2007)
 Paul Bley – Live at Sweet Basil (Soul Note, 1988)
 Bob Brookmeyer and the WDR Big Band – Electricity (1994)
 Royce Campbell – Six by Six: A Jazz Guitar Celebration (rec. 1994, rel. 2004) 
 Stanley Clarke & Bill Shields – Shieldstone (Optimism, 1987)
 Dreams – Dreams (Columbia, 1970)
 Urszula Dudziak – Future Talk (Inner City, 1979)
 Mark Egan - As We Speak (Wavetone, 2006)
 Gil Evans – The Gil Evans Orchestra Plays the Music of Jimi Hendrix (RCA, 1974)
 Jan Garbarek – Eventyr (ECM, 1981)
 Jim Hall – Jim Hall And Friends Live At Town Hall Vol.2 (Musicmasters, 1991) 
 Tom Harrell – Sail Away (Contemporary, 1989)
 Clint Houston – Watership Down (Trio, 1978)
 Bobby Hutcherson – Un Poco Loco (Columbia, 1980)
 Jeff Johnston – Nuage (Justin Time, 2001) 
 Lee Konitz – Sound of Surprise (RCA Victor, 1999)
 Andy LaVerne – Liquid Silver (DMP, 1984)
 Andy LaVerne – Plays the Music of Chick Corea (Jazzline 2008)
 Joe Lovano – Landmarks (Blue Note, 1991)
 Bob Mintzer – Hymn (Owl, 1990)
 Czesław Niemen – Mourner's Rhapsody (1974)
 Mike Nock – Climbing (Tomato, 1979)
 Makoto Ozone – Now You Know (Columbia, 1987)
 Jeff Palmer – Laser Wizzard (Statiras, 1987) 
 Michel Petrucciani – Michel plays Petrucciani (Blue Note, 1988)
 Barre Phillips – Mountainscapes (ECM, 1976)
 Stark Reality – The Stark Reality Discovers Hoagy Carmichael's Music Shop (1970)
 John Surman – Brewster's Rooster (ECM, 2009)
 Harvie Swartz – Arrival (RCA 1992)
 Joseph Tawadros – The Hour of Separation (2010)
 Henri Texier – Colonel Skopje (Label Bleu, 1988)
 The Don Thompson Quartet – A Beautiful Friendship (Concord Jazz, 1984)
 McCoy Tyner – Quartets 4 X 4 (Milestone, 1980)
 Michał Urbaniak – Fusion III (Columbia, 1975)
 Jim Vivian - Sometime Ago (Cornerstone, 2018)
 Jack Walrath – Neohippus (Blue Note, 1989)
 Denny Zeitlin – Tidal Wave (Palo Alto, 1984)

References

External links

 John Abercrombie on ECM Records
 Notes on the Road interview with John Abercrombie
 John Abercrombie interview by Tim Berens, Cincinnati Jazz Guitar Society (March 1996) at TimBerens.com
 John Abercrombie interview by Mark S. Tucker (June 2005) at Perfect Sound Forever, www.furious.com
 John Abercrombie - The Third Quartet (2007) album review by Brad Walseth at JazzChicago.net
 John Abercrombie biography by Chris Kelsey, discography and album reviews, credits & releases at AllMusic
 John Abercrombie discography, album releases & credits at Discogs
 John Abercrombie biography, discography, album credits & user reviews at ProgArchives.com
 John Abercrombie albums to be listened as stream on Spotify

1944 births
2017 deaths
Jazz musicians from New York (state)
People from Port Chester, New York
20th-century American guitarists
21st-century American guitarists
American jazz guitarists
American male guitarists
Berklee College of Music alumni
University of North Texas College of Music alumni
Jazz fusion guitarists
Alessa Records artists
Chesky Records artists
ECM Records artists
20th-century American male musicians
21st-century American male musicians
American male jazz musicians
Dreams (band) members
Gateway (band) members
Double-Time Records artists
Pirouet Records artists